Samuel Jesi (1789 – January 17, 1853) was an Italian engraver.

He was born in Milan in 1789, he was a pupil of Giuseppe Longhi at the Brera Academy of Milan. His first work (1821) was "The Abandonment of Hagar", engraved after a painting by Guercino in the Palazzo di Brera at Milan; this was followed (1834) by "The Madonna with St. John and St. Stephen", from a painting by Fra Bartolomeo in the Cathedral of Lucca. He then devoted himself to the works of Raphael, whom he ably interpreted. His masterpiece is the group representing Pope Leo X with Cardinals Rossi and Giulio dei Medici (1834). While in Paris for the purpose of having it printed he was elected a corresponding member of the Académie des Beaux-Arts, and received the ribbon of the Legion of Honor. In 1846 he began to work on his engraving of the "Cœna Domini", discovered in the Church of S. Onofrio, Florence, and attributed to Raphael. Meanwhile, he engraved the "Madonna della Vite." In 1849 he completed the drawing of the "Cœna Domini", but died in Florence before finishing the engraving.

Jewish Encyclopedia bibliography
Boccardo, Enciclopedia, p. 1079;
Sulamith, vii. 5, p. 341;
Busch's Jahrbuch, 1846, p. 129;
Meyers Konversations-Lexikon.S. U.

References

1789 births
1853 deaths
19th-century Italian Jews
Jewish artists
Italian engravers
Artists from Milan
Brera Academy alumni